YdcW may refer to:

 1-Pyrroline dehydrogenase, an enzyme
 Aminobutyraldehyde dehydrogenase, an enzyme